Fougères-sur-Bièvre is a former commune in the Loir-et-Cher department of central France. On 1 January 2019, it was merged into the new commune Le Controis-en-Sologne.

Population

See also
Château de Fougères-sur-Bièvre
Communes of the Loir-et-Cher department

References

Former communes of Loir-et-Cher